Western Province or West Province may refer to:

Western Province, Cameroon
Western Province, Rwanda
Western Province (Kenya)
Western Province (Papua New Guinea)
Western Province (Solomon Islands)
Western Province, Sri Lanka
Western Province, Zambia
Western Province (Victoria), a division of the Victorian Legislative Council
West Kazakhstan Province
Western Cape Province, South Africa
Western Province (rugby union), a provincial rugby team in the Cape Town region
Western Province Cricket Association, the governing body for cricket in the Cape Town region, or its representative team
Western Province cricket team
Western Province Ice Hockey Association,  is a non-profit organization and member branch of South African Ice Hockey Federation
Western Province Hockey Union, is the governing body for field hockey
West Province (Western Australia), an electoral province of the Western Australian Legislative Council
Western Oblast, Russia
Western Oblast (1917-1918), Russia
Hejaz in Saudi Arabia

See also
Western Boyacá Province, Boyacá, Colombia
Western Savanna Province, Cundinamarca, Colombia
 Gharbia Governorate in Egypt

Province name disambiguation pages